Austbygda, Austbygd, Austbygdi, or Austbygde are place names in the Norwegian language.  The prefix "aust-" means "eastern" and the root word "bygd(a/e/i)" refers to a "village" or "rural countryside".  The name may refer to the following places in Norway:

Places
Austbygdi, Telemark, a village in Tinn municipality in Vestfold og Telemark county, Norway
Austbygde Church, a church in Tinn municipality in Vestfold og Telemark county, Norway
Austbygdi, Osterøy, a village in Osterøy municipality in Vestland county, Norway
Nordre Austbygda, a village in Søndre Land municipality in Innlandet county, Norway
Søre Austbygda, a village in Søndre Land municipality in Innlandet county, Norway

See also
Nordbygda (disambiguation)
Sørbygda (disambiguation)
Vestbygda (disambiguation)